Dadong District is one of ten districts of the prefecture-level city of Shenyang, the capital of the Chinese province of Liaoning. It borders Shenbei New Area to the north, Dongling to the east, Shenhe to the south, and Huanggu to the west.

Toponymy 
Its name derives from the fact that the district started off as the residential area immediately outside the old inner city wall's Fujin Gate, which is also called Great East Gate.

Administrative divisions
Dadong District has fifteen subdistricts:
Wanquan Subdistrict
Guancheng Subdistrict
Chang'an Subdistrict
Dongta Subdistrict
Xindong Subdistrict
Zhulin Subdistrict
Xiaodong Subdistrict
Xiaojinqiao Subdistrict
Dabei Subdistrict
Xiaobei Subdistrict
Taochang Subdistrict
Liaoshen Subdistrict
Dongzhan Subdistrict
Ertaizi Subdistrict
Wenguan Subdistrict

Transport 
The oldest airfield in Shenyang, the now-defunct East Pagoda Airport, is located in Dadong District. It was the headquarters of the defunct China Northern Airlines.

Tourist attractions 
The district contains popular tourist landmarks such as the 9.18 Historical Museum, the North and East Pagodas, Bawang Temple and the Wanquan Park.

Education 
The Shenyang University is located in Dadong. The Shangpin schools, which enrolls students from Grades 1-9, consistently ranks among the top public schools in Shenyang.

References

External links

County-level divisions of Liaoning
Shenyang